Wuling National Forest Recreation Area is located in Heping District, Taichung, Taiwan.

Geology
The forest recreation area spans over an area at the elevation of 1,800-3,884 meters above sea level with annual mean temperature of 16°C. It features the Taoshan Waterfall at the end of the Taoshan Trail.

Transportation
The recreation area is accessible by bus from Taichung Station of Taiwan Railways.

See also
 Geography of Taiwan
 Wuling Farm

References

Geography of Taichung
National forest recreation areas in Taiwan
Tourist attractions in Taichung